Coromandel Aerodrome  is a small aerodrome located 2 Nautical Miles (3.7 km) south of Coromandel Township on the Coromandel Peninsula of the North Island of New Zealand.

Operational information 
 Runway Strength: ESWL 1270

The aerodrome is operated by the Coromandel Flying Club, and has a 'one way' strip, with landing  always on 12 and take-off on 30, except for approved local pilots under unusual weather conditions.  The surface is grass and generally usable even in wet weather.

The Airport has also been modelled for Microsoft Flight Simulator X.

References 
NZAIP Volume 4 AD
New Zealand AIP (PDF)

Airports in New Zealand
Coromandel Peninsula
Transport buildings and structures in Waikato